Kui Sadaf (also Romanized as Kūi Sadaf; also known as Qazzāq Maḩalleh) is a village in Estarabad-e Jonubi Rural District, in the Central District of Gorgan County, Golestan Province, Iran. At the 2006 census, its population was 1,712, in 336 families.

References 

Populated places in Gorgan County